PSO J030947.49+271757.31, sometimes shortened to PSO J0309+27, is the most distant known blazar, as of 2020. It lies in Aries. The blazar has a redshift of 6.1, meaning its light took almost 13 billion years to reach Earth, when the universe was about 1 billion years old, and its present comoving distance is about 30 billion light-years. It was discovered by a team of researchers led by Silvia Belladitta, a Ph.D. student at the University of Insubria, working for the Italian National Institute for Astrophysics (INAF) in Milan, Italy.

References

Further reading

Blazars
Astronomical objects discovered in 2020
Aries (constellation)